Vicekorpral (vicekonstapel in the artillery) is a Swedish rank above menig and below korpral that existed until 1972 as a trainee rank for conscripts who were undertaking training to become deputy squad leaders or squad leaders. 
The rank was reintroduced 2009 to denote soldiers at OR-3 level.

History

Insignias before 1972

See also 
 Finnish military ranks
 Military ranks of the Swedish armed forces
 Swedish Armed Forces

Military ranks of the Swedish Army